Jean Dinning (March 29, 1924 – February 22, 2011) was an American singer and songwriter, best known for co-writing, with her then-husband, Red Surrey, the 1959 hit song "Teen Angel", the most popular version of which was sung by her brother Mark Dinning.

Personal life
Born Eugenia Doy Dinning, she was one of nine children.  In the 1940s, she had several hits as a member of The Dinning Sisters.  At the time of her death, she left two surviving Dinning siblings, (Virginia,  "Ginger", and Dolores, a.k.a. "Tootsie").

Death
She died on February 22, 2011, aged 86, in Garden Grove, California.

Notes

External links
 

1924 births
2011 deaths
American women singers
Songwriters from Oklahoma
Singers from Oklahoma
Singers from Tennessee
Songwriters from Tennessee
21st-century American women